Niravoline is a chemical compound with the formula .  It has diuretic and aquaretic effects and has been studied for its potential use for cerebral edema and cirrhosis.

It exerts its pharmacological effect as a kappa opioid receptor agonist.

References

Abandoned drugs
Diuretics
Kappa-opioid receptor agonists
Nitrobenzenes
Pyrrolidines